The Merry Wives of Windsor (German:Die lustigen Weiber von Windsor) is a 1965 Austrian-British historical comedy film directed by Georg Tressler and starring Norman Foster, Colette Boky and Charles Igor Gorin.

Cast
 Norman Foster as Sir John Falstaff  
 Colette Boky as Mistress Ford  
 Charles Igor Gorin as Mr. Ford  
 Mildred Miller as Mistress Page  
 Lucia Popp as Mistress Ann 
 John Gittings as Dr. Cajus  
 Rosella Hightower as Ballerina 
 Edmond Hurshell as Herr Reich 
 Marshall Reynor as Spärlich  
 Ernst Schütz as Fenton

References

Bibliography 
 Eddie Sammons. Shakespeare: A Hundred Years on Film. Scarecrow Press, 2004.

External links 
 

1965 films
Austrian historical comedy films
British historical comedy films
1960s historical comedy films
1960s German-language films
Films based on The Merry Wives of Windsor
Films directed by Georg Tressler
Austrian films based on plays
British films based on plays
Opera films
1960s British films